The Peshwa (Pronunciation: [pe(ː)ʃʋaː]) was the appointed (later becoming hereditary) prime minister of the Maratha Empire of the Indian subcontinent. Originally, the Peshwas served as subordinates to the Chhatrapati (the Maratha Emperor); later, under the Bhat family, they became the de facto leaders of the Maratha Confederacy, with the Chhatrapati becoming a nominal ruler. During the last years of the Maratha Empire, the Peshwas themselves were reduced to titular leaders, and remained under the authority of the Maratha nobles and the British East India Company.

All Peshwas during the rule of Shivaji, Sambhaji and Rajaram belonged to Deshastha Brahmin community. The first Peshwa was Moropant Pingle, who was appointed as the head of the Ashta Pradhan (council of eight ministers) by Chhatrapati Shivaji Maharaj, the founder of the Maratha Empire. The initial Peshwas were all ministers who served as the chief executives to the king. The later Peshwas held the highest administrative office and also controlled the Maratha confederacy. Under the Chitpavan Brahmin Bhat family, the Peshwas became the de facto hereditary administrators of the Confederacy. The Peshwa's office was most powerful under Baji Rao I (r. 1720–1740). Under Peshwa administration and with the support of several key generals and diplomats, the Maratha Empire reached its zenith, ruling major areas of India. The subsequent Peshwas brought in autonomy and as a result later on many provinces were controlled and administered by the Maratha nobles such as Scindias and Gaekwads.

In 1760, the peace of Peshwa government was broken by a rising of Kolis under their Naik Javji Bamble. Javji withdrew to the hills and organised a series of gang robberies, causing widespread terror and misery throughout the country. For twenty years he held out bravely, defeating and killing the generals the Peshwa's Government sent against him. At last he was so hotly pursued that, on the advice of Dhondo Gopal, the Peshwa's governor at Nasik, he surrendered all his forts to Tukoji Holkar and, through Holkar's influence, was pardoned and placed in military and police charge of a district of sixty villages with powers of life and death outlaws. In 1798, a fresh disturbance took place among the Kolis. The leader of this outbreak was Ramji Naik Bhangria, who was an abler and more daring man than his predecessors, and succeeded in baffling all the efforts of the Government officers to seize him. As force seemed hopeless, the Government offered Ramji a pardon and gave him an important police post.

First use

The word Peshwa is from Persian  pēshwā, meaning "foremost, leader". The term was inherited from the political vocabulary of previous Persianate empires operating in the Deccan. As early as 1397, the Bahmani Sultanate designated its prime minister as "peshwa". In the 16th and 17th centuries, this practice was continued by the Ahmednagar Sultanate and the Bijapur Sultanate, both successor states of the Bahmani Sultanate. After the coronation of Shivaji in 1674, he appointed Moropant Trimbak Pingle as his first Peshwa. Shivaji renamed this designation as Pantpradhan in 1674 but this term was less commonly used. Moropant Trimbak Pingale's son, Nilopant Moreshvar Pingale, succeeded him during Sambhaji's rule after Moropant Pingle's death in 1683.

Ramchandra Pant Amatya (Bawadekar)

Ramchandra Amatya recaptured many forts from the Mughals between 1690 and 1694, some in person, as well as personally conducting guerilla war techniques. When Rajaram I fled to Jinji in 1689, before leaving Maharashtra, he gave "Hukumat panha" (King Status) to Pant. Ramchandra Pant managed the entire state under many challenges such as the Mughal influx, the betrayal of Vatandars, and scarcity of food. With his help, Sachiv kept the Maratha State on a sound economic footing.

Bhat Family

The Maratha war of succession between Tara Bai and Shahu resulted in latter's victory and assumption of Maratha throne as Chhatrapati. In 1713, Shahu appointed Balaji Vishwanath (Bhat), as Peshwa. The appointment of Balaji's son, Baji Rao I, as Peshwa in 1719 by Shahu made the position hereditary in the Bhat family. Baji Rao proved his loyalty by controlling the feudal chieftains who wanted independence from the Maratha Empire. The rebellion of General Trimbak Rao Dabhade, the senapati (commander in chief), over Chauthai (revenue collection) of Gujarat is one example of such internal Maratha feuds. The followers of Baji and Trimbak clashed at the Battle of Bilhapur on 1 April 1731, and Trimbak was killed. In gratitude, Shahu gave the Peshwas and the Bhat family unchallenged control over Maratha empire. who also appointed Baji Rao's son as Peshwa in 1740, gave considerable authority to the Peshwas to command the Maratha armies, and they responded well during his reigns.

At the time of his death in 1749, Shahu made the Peshwas his successors under these conditions: Shivaji's descendants, who remained as the titular Raja of Satara, were called Swami (Marathi for the 'real owner') by the Peshwas who reported to them, and officially they were to seek guidance from the Raja. However, the Peshwa also became a ceremonial head of state after the battle of Panipat and the death of Madhavrao.

Legacy
The first Peshwa to receive the status of a pantpradhan was Ramchandra Pant Amatya Bawdekar in 1689 by Rajaram. The first (Bhat) Deshmukh family Peshwa was Balaji Vishwanath (Bhat) Deshmukh. He was succeeded as Peshwa by his son Baji Rao I, who never lost a battle. Baji Rao and his son, Balaji Baji Rao, oversaw the period of greatest Maratha expansion, brought to an end by the Marathas' defeat by an Afghan army at the Third Battle of Panipat in 1761. The last Peshwa, Baji Rao II, was defeated by the British East India Company in the Battle of Khadki which was a part of Third Anglo-Maratha War (1817–1818). The Peshwa's land (Peshwai) was annexed to the British East India Company's Bombay province, and Bajirao II, the Peshwa was pensioned off.

List of Peshwas

Hereditary Peshwas from Bhat family

Notable generals and diplomats

 
 Khando Ballal Chitnis
 Javji Bamble
 Annaji Datto Sachiv
 Balaji Kunjar
 Bapu Gokhale 
 Govind Pant Bundela
 Ibrahim Khan Gardi
 Mahadaji Shinde
 Malhar Rao Holkar
 Nana Phadnawis
 Niranjan Madhav Parasnis
 Parshuram Pant Pratinidhi
 Sakharam Hari Gupte
 Pilaji Rao Gaekwad
 Ranoji Scindia
 Sadashivrao Bhau
 Santaji Ghorpade 
 Shamsher Bahadur
 Visaji Krushna Biniwale

In popular culture

Kaustubh Kasture has written a book in marathi titled "Peshwai-Maharashtrachya Itihasatil Ek Suvarnapan" based on Peshwai.
Pramod Oak has written a book in marathi titled "Peshwe Gharanyacha Itihas" where he gave detailed information about Peshwas of Bhat family.

See also

 Maratha titles
 Maratha clan system
 List of Maratha dynasties and states
 Peshawe Family
 List of people involved in the Maratha Empire

References

Bibliography

 
Hindu dynasties
Titles of national or ethnic leadership
History of Maharashtra
Maratha Empire
Heads of government